Elena Veniaminovna Volkova (born 9 April 1983) is a Russian basketball shooting guard. She was part of the Russian national team that won the silver medal at the 2009 European Championships. Her club Dynamo Kursk also placed second at the 2013–14 EuroCup.

References

1983 births
Living people
Russian women's basketball players
Shooting guards